The Arno Trail is an approximately 1200-km long-distance trail through the Austrian Alps. The highest point is atop the Sonnblick (3106 m.) near Bad Gastein, and in total the trail has over 57,000 m. of elevation gain. The highest elevations are in the western portion of the trail, in the Kalkberge, Pinzgauer Grasberge and Keesberge. The Arno Trail forms a loop which passes through such towns as Salzburg, Neukirchen, Bad Gastein and Nußdorf. It runs predominantly through Austria, although two stages pass through Germany's Berchtesgaden Alps and by the Königssee. The trail can be completed in just over 60 stages, many of which end at alpine huts run by the Austrian Alpine Club. It can be shortened by just under a week by crossing from Fuschl immediately to Salzburg in two stages and thus avoiding seven stages in the relatively low-lying foothills.

See also
 List of highest paved roads in Europe
 List of mountain passes

External links 
Website for the Arnoweg (in German and English)
User-Blog about the Arnoweg with many pictures (in German)

Alps
Hiking trails in Austria
Mountain passes of the Alps
Mountain passes of Salzburg (state)
Geography of Salzburg (state)
Glockner Group
Granatspitze Group
Ankogel Group
Venediger Group